Western Plains may refer to:

In Australia

 Far West (New South Wales)
 Taronga Western Plains Zoo, formerly just Western Plains Zoo, near Dubbo, New South Wales
 Western Plains (New South Wales), an area west of the Great Dividing Range in New South Wales, Australia, centred on Dubbo
 Western Plains Regional Council, former name for Dubbo Regional Council 
 Western Plains wine zone, Geographical Indication which extends from vineyards near Dubbo across to the South Australia and Queensland borders

In North America
 Great Plains, also known as Western Plains, a broad expanse of flatland west of the Mississippi River and east of the Rocky Mountains in the United States and Canada
 Western Plains District of the boy scouts in Oklahoma, United States
 Western Plains District (Church of the Brethren), a district of the Church of the Brethren in the United States
 Western Plains USD 106, a public unified school district in Ransom, Kansas, United States